Club Sport Marítimo Juniors (Juniores in Portuguese) is the youth team department of the Portuguese football club C.S. Marítimo. They play their home games at the Campo do Andorinha in the suburb of Santo António in Funchal, Madeira.

There are main development teams in the Under-19's category (Juniores "A"), Under-17's (Juvenis "B"), Under-15's (Iniciados "C") and Under-13's (Infantis "D"), with further teams in the Under-12's, Under-11's and Under-9's age groups completing the club's youth academy.

Notable former players
 Briguel
 Bruno
 Danny
 Paulinho
 Pinga
 Tito
 Ytalo

C.S. Marítimo
Sport in Madeira
1910 establishments in Portugal